John Charles Lax (July 23, 1911 – July 14, 2001) was an American ice hockey player who competed in the 1936 Winter Olympics.

In 1936 he was a member of the American ice hockey team, which won the bronze medal.

He was born and died in Arlington, Massachusetts.

External links
 
 profile

1911 births
2001 deaths
American men's ice hockey centers
Ice hockey players from Massachusetts
Ice hockey players at the 1936 Winter Olympics
Olympic bronze medalists for the United States in ice hockey
People from Arlington, Massachusetts
Medalists at the 1936 Winter Olympics
Sportspeople from Middlesex County, Massachusetts
Boston University Terriers men's ice hockey players